Chloealtis aspasma is a species of grasshopper in the family Acrididae. It is native to northern California and southern Oregon in the United States. It is known by the common names Siskiyou short-horned grasshopper and Siskiyou Chloealtis grasshopper.

References 

Gomphocerinae
Orthoptera of North America
Fauna of California
Fauna of the Northwestern United States
Taxonomy articles created by Polbot